The Kiruna mine is the largest and most modern underground iron ore mine in the world. The mine is located in Kiruna in Norrbotten County, Lapland, Sweden. The mine is owned by Luossavaara-Kiirunavaara AB (LKAB), a large Swedish mining company. In 2018 the mine produced 26.9 million tonnes of iron ore. Since mining began at the site in 1898, the mine has produced over 950 million tonnes of ore. As of 2020 the main haulage level is 1365 m below the ore outcrop at Kiirunavaara that existed prior to mining.

In 2004, it was decided that the present centre of the city would need to be relocated to accommodate mining-related subsidence. The relocation would be made gradually over decades.

On May 18, 2020 an earthquake of approximate 4.9 Mw was triggered in the footwall of the mine. The earthquake was not natural but induced by the mining activity.

Geology
The ore deposit at Kiruna is part of a larger iron ore province stretching west-east from Kiruna to the Finnish border. This province includes thus also the ores at Svappavaara and Pajala. Malmberget is a large notable southward outlier of this province. The largest ore bodies in the province are of iron oxide-apatite type, yet skarn iron deposits exists at Masugnsbyn and Hindersön. The iron ores that lie closest to the Kiirunavaara are Loussavaara, Henry, Nakutus, Rektorn and Lappmalmen.

The ore
The ore is predominately magnetite and disseminated interstitial apatite, with an average of 0.9% phosphorus. The ore body has the form a large sheet inclined about 60° to the east. At surface this sheet is about 4 km long and averages 90 m in width. From geophysical studies it has been inferred that the ore continues as coherent sheet at least 1500 m below the surface. In many places the ore transition to apparently disorganised ore veins in the country rock. Apatite is by far the main gangue mineral while other gangue minerals are tremolite-actinolite and calcite. Apatite is at places evenly distributed in the magnetite ore, but occurs also as veins and bands. Diopside and biotite are also common gangue minerals but occur only in very small amounts. For reasons related to ore processing the ore in Kiruna Mine is divided into two quality types based on chemistry, phosphorus-poor B-ore and phosphorus-rich D-ore, the latter being more common closer to the surface.

Within the orebody, there is a volume of hematite ore with the same strike (direction) as the main orebody. The thickness of this seemingly coherent hematite body is mostly within the range of decimeters but at one location it reaches 25 m.  

The largest deposit of rare earth metals discovered in Europe was announced by LKAB in January 2023 to be at Kiruna.

Origin

The origin of the Kiruna ore has been the matter of a protracted scientific debate, with the main point of contention being whether the ore is solidified magma or not.

The Kiruna mineral deposit was formed following intense volcanic activity. One theory holds that the ores are the result of magmatic differentiation. Iron-rich solutions precipitated the iron on to a syenite porphyry footwall. Then the ore bed was covered by further volcanic deposits, quartz porphyry, and sedimentary rocks. Later the whole body was tilted to its current dip of 50 to 60°.

The hematite bodies of Kiruna are considered by R. Frietsch to be "hydrothermal impregnations".

The geology of the Kiruna ore has many parallels to that of the iron ore of El Laco volcano in Chile, leading to the claim they were both formed by volcanic activity.

In 1973 Tibor Parák pointed out a series of problems with the magmatic origin theory and proposed instead that the ore originated as a sediment in a volcanic environment. In 1975 Párak listed various arguments against a magmatic origin for the ore. The existence of "abundant fragments and balls" of ore found in the hanging wall of the Kiruna Ore and the nearby Loussavaara Ore are deemed by Párak to be contrary to a magmatic origin for the ore. The grading of massive ore into quartz-banded ores at the nearby Per Geijer Ore is also deemed by Parák to be contrary to magmatic origin. Parák also argued that the form of the orebodies as tilted sheets is also indicative of them being sedimentary units. Parák further argues that the "ore breccia" at Loussavaara Ore is due to its chemistry and texture not equivalent to the main ore bodies.

Footwall
The waste rock at the footwall of the ore is syenite porphyry. At places this syenite porphyry has nodules variously filled with actinolite, apatite, titanite and magnetite.

In some rare cases nodules are filled with zircon. To the west the syenite porphyry borders the Kurravaara conglomerate which underlies it stratigraphically.

Hanging wall
The hanging wall of the Kiruna ore is made up of quartz porphyry.

History

In 1902 the Kiruna Narvik Railway was completed, allowing the shipment of ore through the ice-free port of Narvik.

In the beginning, surface mining was used, but the mine has been mined with the sublevel caving mining method since the 1960s. In 1985 reserves for the Kiruna Mine were 1,800 million tonnes grading 60–65% iron and 0.2% phosphorus. As of 2018 the Kiruna Mine had Proven and Probable Reserves of 683 million tonnes grading 43.8% iron.

The  level could support iron ore production until 2018.

Moving the town 
The re-development of Kiruna is a reconstruction project, as the Kirunavaara mine, run by LKAB, undermines the current town centre. The town centre is to be moved  to the east. 21 of the most important buildings are to be moved.

In 2004, it was decided that the city centre would need to be relocated to accommodate mining-related subsidence. The relocation would be made gradually over the coming decade. In January 2007 a new location was proposed, to the northwest at the foot of  Luossavaara mountain, by Lake Luossajärvi.

The first physical work moving the town commenced in November 2007, when work on the new main sewerage pipe started.

In the same week, first sketches for the layout of the new part of the town became available. The sketches include a travel centre, the new locations for the city hall and the church, an artificial lake and an extension of the Luossavaara hill into the city. The location of the new section of the E10 is still uncertain, as is the location of the railway and the railway station. A more official sketch was published early in the spring of 2008, which was then discussed with various interest groups before a further version was to be produced.

In June 2010 the city council decided that the town would be moved eastwards (to ), in the direction of Tuolluvaara, instead of the proposed northwestern location. The town move was started in 2014 in a process that will continue to 2040, with the centre-most part of the town re-established by 2022. White Arkitekter AB based in Stockholm and Ghilardi + Hellsten Arkitekter based in Oslo together with researchers from Luleå and Delft universities won the contract to design the new city, which envisages a denser city centre with a greater focus on sustainability, green and blue infrastructure, pedestrians and public transport rather than automobiles.

See also 
Hauki quartzite
Kiirunavaara
Swedish iron ore during World War II
Underground mining (hard rock)

References 

Bibliography

External links

Official website

1898 establishments in Sweden
Iron mines in Sweden
Kiruna Municipality
Underground mines in Sweden